Octoglena bivirgata is a species of millipede in the family Hirudisomatidae. It is found in North America.

References

Further reading

External links

 

Polyzoniida
Millipedes of North America
Articles created by Qbugbot
Animals described in 1864